The Yum Yum Children, also known as YMYM FAM, are a Christian band originally from Portland, Oregon, now located in Oklahoma. Their music is similar to that of They Might Be Giants or 1970s style art rock.

Background

Prior to his involvement with the Yum Yum Children, Leon Goodenough was in a "psychedelic-thrash-garage" / hardcore band called The Clergy, fronted by female vocalist, Christi Simonatti, male drummer, Randy Simonatti and completed by Jim Swanson. They released only one album, RUAMI, in 1993 on Broken Records. RUAMI was recorded live in the studio and featured an overall sound similar to that of X or early Concrete Blonde. One reviewer stated that their style "switches gears faster than a Lamborghini" and that the band displayed an excellent songwriting sensibility. The Clergy toured with Crashdog and the Jesus Freaks in the early 1994.

Following RUAMI, Leon and Jennifer Goodenough created the Yum Yum Children with a reformed lineup of players and a new sound, which was now comparable to the general market bands The B-52's, or Violent Femmes, or in Christian markets Fat and Frantic. Speaking about the transition to the Yum Yum Children, True Tunes News reported that the Goodenoughs' "seem to have eaten some bad cheese and have gotten all goofy on us." Their songs generally have complex and imaginative structures and arrangements, with lyrics that match in complexity and silliness. Their lyrics are based in their Christian viewpoint, although at times the message is not easily decipherable.

Goodenough, created Yum Yum Children originally as a solo project as an outlet mixing elements of 60's bubblegum, garage, folk, and mod into a palatable helping of eccentricity. The songs generally have complex and imaginative structures and arrangements, with lyrics that match in complexity and silliness. Under the name "Yum Yum Children" the band released Tastythanks, Dufisized, Used to Would've, and later as "YMYM" released Bulletin of the Returner and The Sparkle in Someone's Eye. Currently performing under the moniker of "YMYM FAM", Goodenough and his talented children perform their quirky rock originals.

Goodenough and his bandmates have performed at Tom Fest, Cornerstone Festival, XFestNW, various clubs, coffee houses and churches in Portland, Spokane, Bartlesville, and Tulsa.

Yum Yum Children has been associated with Boot to Head Records, Five Minute Walk Records, and Quiver Society for the releases of their albums.

Discography
1994: Tastythanks
1995: Dufisized (Boot to Head)
1996: Used to Would've (5 Minute Walk)
2007: Bulletin of the Returner (Quiver Society)
2008: The Sparkle In Someone's Eye

Members 
 Original lineup
R. Leon Goodenough - vocals, guitar
Jennifer Goodenough - vocals
Bob Sable - percussion
Dennis Childers - keyboard
Craig Smith - jazz bass, vocal

 Additional musicians
Mark McCary - drums
Brock Dittus - bass
Jon Weller - keys

Current lineup:

 R. Leon Goodenough - vocals, guitar
 Jennifer Goodenough - vocals
 Ephraim Goodenough - drums, violin, mandolin, synth, vocals
 Havilah Goodenough - keyboards, vocals
 Asaph Goodenough - Bass, vocals
 Zion Goodenough - Drums
 Zuriel Goodenough - Keyboards, vocals
 Naphtali Goodenough - Drums

References

 

American Christian musical groups
Musical groups from Oregon